Qarab-e Olya (also Romanized as Qārāb-e ‘Olyā; also known as Fārāb-e ‘Olyā, Qārāb, Qārāb Bālā, Qārāb-e Bālā, and Verkhnyaya Kerov) is a village in Kaghazkonan-e Shomali Rural District, Kaghazkonan District, Meyaneh County, East Azerbaijan Province, Iran. At the 2006 census, its population was 125, in 33 families.

References 

Populated places in Meyaneh County